Robinson Lewis Greiner, Jr. (August 24, 1932 – November 7, 2021) was an American pair skater. With Carole Ormaca, he was a four-time consecutive U.S. national champion, from 1953 to 1956. They placed fourth at three World Championships and finished fifth at the 1956 Winter Olympics.

Greiner later competed with Sheila Wells, taking silver at the 1958 U.S. Championships. In 1965, he was inducted into the Fresno County Athletic Hall of Fame along with his skating partner, Carole Ormaca. Greiner later moved to Fresno where he became an activist for GLBT rights and social justice. In 2008, he legally married his partner of 43 years, Ellis Vance.

Results

With Ormaca

With Wells

References
 
 Robin Greiner's obituary

1932 births
2021 deaths
American male pair skaters
Figure skaters at the 1956 Winter Olympics
Olympic figure skaters of the United States
Figure skaters from San Jose, California
American LGBT sportspeople
LGBT people from California